Skanderborg railway station ( or Skanderborg Banegård) is a railway station serving the town of Skanderborg in East Jutland, Denmark.

The station is located on the Fredericia-Aarhus railway line from Fredericia to Aarhus and is the eastern terminus of the Skanderborg-Skjern railway line from Skanderborg to Skjern. It offers direct InterCity services to Copenhagen, Hamburg, Aarhus and Aalborg as well as regional train services to Aarhus, Fredericia, Esbjerg, Herning, Skjern and Struer. The train services are operated by DSB and Arriva.

History 
Skanderborg station was opened in 1868 with the opening of the Fredericia-Aarhus railway line from Fredericia to Aarhus. In 1871, Skanderborg station also became the eastern terminus of the Skanderborg-Skjern railway line.

Operations 
The train services are operated by DSB and Arriva. The station offers direct InterCity services to Copenhagen, Flensburg, Aarhus and Aalborg as well as regional train services to Aarhus, Fredericia, Esbjerg, Herning, Skjern and Struer.

References

Citations

Bibliography

External links

 Banedanmark – government agency responsible for maintenance and traffic control of most of the Danish railway network
 DSB – largest Danish train operating company
 Arriva – British multinational public transport company operating bus and train services in Denmark
 Danske Jernbaner – website with information on railway history in Denmark

Railway stations opened in 1868
Railway stations in the Central Denmark Region
1868 establishments in Denmark
Railway stations in Denmark opened in the 19th century